The La Trice Classic is a Perth Racing Group 3 Thoroughbred horse race for fillies and mares that are three-year-olds and older, held under set weights with penalties conditions over 1800 metres, held at Ascot Racecourse in Perth, Western Australia each year in January.  Prize money is A$150,000.

History
The race is named in honour of La Trice, a Western Australian mare who was the first horse to win the Karrakatta Plate and Railway Stakes double in 1967/68.  She also won consecutive Winterbottom Stakes in 1970/71.

Since 2011 the race is run on Perth Cup race meeting card.

Grade
prior 2014 - Listed race
2014 onwards - Group 3

Winners

 2023 - Alsephina
 2022 - Beret
2021 - Dance Music
2020 - Perfect Jewel
2019 - Celebrity Dream
2018 - I'm Feeling Lucky
2016 (Dec) - Cosmic Storm
2016 (Jan) - Ideal Image
2015 - Vampi Lass
2014 - Elite Belle
2013 - Mabel Grace
2012 - race not held   
2011 - Rosie Rocket
2010 - Tranquility
2009 - Impressive Jeuney
2008 (Dec) - Sky Drama
2008 (Jan) - Russian Playmate
2007 - Keyton Grace
2006 - Belle Bizarre
2005 - Urban Chill
2004 - Kentiara  
2003 - Fortune Streak

See also

 List of Australian Group races
 Group races

References

Horse races in Australia
Flat horse races for three-year-olds
Sport in Perth, Western Australia